Mount Gabi is an underwater mountain, similar to a guyot, that was discovered in 2006,  off the coast of Augusta near the south-western tip of Western Australia. It lies a similar distance west of Windy Harbour

Mount Gabi was discovered by Cameron Buchanan, a multibeam sonar specialist from Geoscience Australia, the Australian national agency for geoscience research, via swath mapper during investigations of continental shelf processes between the Great Australian Bight and Cape Leeuwin.

References

External links 
Geoscience Australia

South coast of Western Australia